Wakana (written: 若菜, 若奈, 和可菜, 和可那, 和佳奈 or わかな in hiragana) is a feminine Japanese given name. Notable people with the name include:

, Japanese idol singer and a member of Japanese girl group Angerme
, Japanese actress and former idol
, Japanese tarento and actress
, Japanese actress
, Japanese badminton player
, Japanese singer
, Japanese actress and writer
, Japanese tarento
, Japanese actress, voice actress and narrator

Fictional characters
, a character in the manga series Muteki Kanban Musume
, a character in the manga series My Dress-Up Darling

Japanese feminine given names